Armenian architecture comprises architectural works with an aesthetic or historical connection to the Armenian people. It is difficult to situate this architectural style within precise geographical or chronological limits, but many of its monuments were created in the regions of historical Armenia, the Armenian Highlands. The greatest achievement of Armenian architecture is generally agreed to be its medieval churches and seventh century churches, though there are different opinions precisely in which respects.

Common characteristics of Armenian architecture 

Medieval Armenian architecture, and Armenian churches in particular, have several distinctive features, which some believe to be the first national style of a church building.

Common characteristics include:
Pointed domes, reminiscent of the volcanic cone of Greater Ararat.  The conical or semiconical radially segmented dome or cupola is mounted above vaulted ceilings on a cylindrical drum (usually polygonal on the outside, most often octagonal)
The vertical emphasis of the whole structure, with the height often exceeding the length of a church
Reinforcement of the verticality with tall, narrow windows
Stone vaulted ceilings
Composed almost entirely of stone, usually volcanic tuff or basalt.
A composite roof composed of finely-cut tuff shingles
Frescoes and carvings, if present, are usually ornate and include swirling intertwining grapevines and foliage.
Heavy use of tall structural arches, both for supporting the cupola as part of the drum, the vaulted ceiling, and the vertical walls.
Roofs intersecting to support the dome, both in basilicas and centrally-planned churches.
Sculptural decoration of external walls, including figures.

Classification of Armenian churches 
Within the bounds of the aforementioned common characteristics, individual churches display considerable variation which may reflect time, place, and the creativity of its designer. Toros Toramanian distinguished the following classical styles while studying these variations in the early 20th century:

Construction 

Armenian architecture, as it originates in an earthquake-prone region, tends to be built with this hazard in mind.  Armenian buildings tend to be rather low-slung and thick-walled in design.  Armenia has abundant resources of stone, and relatively few forests, so stone was nearly always used throughout for large buildings. Small buildings and most residential buildings were normally constructed of lighter materials, and hardly any early examples survive, as at the abandoned medieval capital of Ani.

The stone used in buildings is typically quarried all at the same location, in order to give the structure a uniform color. In cases where different color stone are used, they are often intentionally contrasted in a striped or checkerboard pattern. Powder made out of ground stone of the same type was often applied along the joints of the tuff slabs to give buildings a seamless look. Unlike the Romans or Syrians who were building at the same time, Armenians never used wood or brick when building large structures.

Armenian architecture employs a form of concrete to produce sturdy buildings,. It is a mixture of lime mortar, broken tuff, and rocks around which forms a core against which thin slabs of tuff are arranged in brickwork fashion. As the wet mortar mixture dries it forms a strong concrete-like mass sealed together with the tuff around it and, due to tuff's properties, it becomes harder with time. Initially, almost no core was used in the construction of churches, stone blocks were simply sealed together, but as architects saw how those with mortar cores withstood tremors, the size of the core expanded. Frescos of marble or another stone were often affixed to the side of these buildings, usually at a later date.

History of Armenian architecture 
The gradual development of Armenian architecture.

Pre-Christian Armenia 

During the third millennium B.C, prehistoric Armenian architecture was already distinctive. The most common feature was its groundwork, which incorporated many geometrical shapes, ultimately forming a cell shape. An example of such architecture can be found in Kültəpə, near Nakhchivan. These buildings were approximately 6–7 metres wide and about 5 metres high.

Urban architectural traditions, and other forms of art in the years before Christ continued to develop and later were influenced by Greco-Roman art. Urartian architecture is known for its use of intricately cut rocks, used as foundations for mud brick buildings, usually constructed in a compact manner (such as in Erebuni).

Urartian temples had massive stone walls at lower levels and a relatively small interior space, usually square, and rose high; they were generally placed at the highest point of a site.  Higher levels were in mud brick, which has not survived, and it is not fully clear how appeared.  The late Temple of Garni of the 1st century AD, in a fully Hellenistic style, is the only pagan monument left in any sort of complete state in Armenia, as many others were destroyed or converted to Christian places of worship under Tiridates III of Armenia.  Garni includes local elements of sacred numerology and geometry.  The temple has a column to inter column ratio of 1/3 (1 is the primary number of the universe and 3 is the holiest of all numbers as it represents the Greco-Roman triad Jupiter, Juno and Minerva). Aside from being aesthetically beautiful, Garni's design can be seen as being a reaffirmation of the universal laws that governed man's destiny. The angles, number of columns, and dimensions were created with a careful eye; Armenian pagans wanted to appease the gods and protect humanity from their wrath. This sacred geometry is evident in the entire temple. To the people who created it, it was the perfect embodiment of their communion with the universe. Note that although sacred geometry was mostly used in religious buildings, secular buildings adopted some aspects of it.

Christian Armenia 

Christianity's institution as Armenia's official religion in 301 allowed new developments in Armenian architecture, which nevertheless preserved older traditions. In fact it would be almost impossible to find any religion that rose completely on its own without borrowing some traditions from the past. Exploring Armenian churches is critical to our understanding of Medieval Armenia. Beyond that, the Armenian churches describe us the general landscape of the Christian East at a time when eyewitness accounts were exceedingly rare. In their messages of authenticity and legitimacy, the churches shaped and preserved public memory, negotiating among diverse linguistic, religious, political, and ethnic groups.

The first Armenian churches were built on the orders of St. Gregory the Illuminator, and were often built on top of pagan temples, and imitated some aspects of Armenian pre-Christian architecture.

Periods in Armenian architecture 
Classical and Medieval Armenian architecture is divided into four separate periods.

The formative period 
The first Armenian churches were built between the 4th and 7th century, beginning when Armenia converted to Christianity, and ending with the Arab invasion of Armenia.  The early churches were mostly simple basilicas, but some with side apses. By the 5th century the typical cupola cone in the center had become widely used. By the 7th century, centrally-planned churches had been built and a more complicated niched buttress and radiating Hrip'simé style had formed. By the time of the Arab invasion, most of what we now know as classical Armenian architecture had formed.

Bagratid revival 

From the 9th to 11th century, Armenian architecture underwent a revival under the patronage of the Bagratid Dynasty with a great deal of building done in the area of Lake Van, this included both traditional styles and new innovations. Ornately carved Armenian khachkars were developed during this time. Many new cities and churches were built during this time, including a new capital at Lake Van and a new Cathedral on Akdamar Island to match. The Cathedral of Ani was also completed during this dynasty. It was during this time that the first major monasteries, such as Haghpat  and Haritchavank were built. This period was ended by the Seljuk invasion.

Monasteries flourish 

From the 12th to 14th century under the Zakarid dynasty saw an explosion in the number of monasteries built, including Saghmosavank Monastery, the Akhtala monastery, Kaymaklı Monastery, Kecharis Monastery and Makaravank Monastery. Monasteries were institutes of learning, and much of medieval Armenian literature was written in this time period. The invasion of Timurlane and the destruction of Cilician Armenia ended architectural progression from another 250 years.

Seventeenth century 

The last great period in classic Armenian construction was under the Iranian Safavid Shahs, under which a number of new churches were built, usually at existing holy sites such as Etchmiadzin as well as in diaspora communities like New Julfa.

Nineteenth century 
Armenian architecture experienced a huge stage of development during the 19th century, when the Russians entered Eastern Armenia. A number of architectural masterpieces were built in the Kumayri historic district of Alexandropol and Yerevan
, as well in Kars, which is now a part of the Republic of Turkey.

The Armenian buildings of that time were mainly made of black tuff, therefore those buildings were mainly of black color.

Gallery of Armenian architecture of the 19th century

Modern times 
One of the most prolific architects of Armenian architectural monuments in the 20th century was Baghdasar Arzoumanian. Based in Yerevan, Armenia, he was the author of an great number of civil and church buildings along with other designs. The legendary architects of the 20th century were Alexander Tamanyan, Rafael Israyelyan, G. Kochar, E. Tigranyan, S. Safaryan, etc. Today the masters of Armenian architecture are S.Gurzadyan, S. Kalashyan, L. Khristaforyan, R. Asratyan etc.

Devastation of Armenian architecture 

As a result of Anti-Armenianism, relics of Armenia's past such as churches, cemeteries and khachkars in neighboring countries have been subject to devastation. In certain cases such as in Turkey or Azerbaijan, this had been as a result of national campaigns to eradicate traces of the Armenian people to thwart any potential claims by the Armenian state.

The largest collection in the world was formerly to be found at the ruins of Old Jugha in Nakhichevan (today's Azerbaijan). Reports (see RFE/RL) and photographs from observers in Iranian territory emerged at the end of 2005 showing Azeri soldiers making deliberate attempts to destroy the gravestones. More recent photographs have revealed that the entire graveyard has been obliterated and a military training ground has been constructed on the site.

Armenian architecture in the diaspora 
The tumultuous past of Armenia over the last millennium has resulted in the formation of an extensive Armenian Diaspora in various corners of the globe. Armenian communities seeking to keep the traditions of their homeland, influenced the architectural vernacular of Armenian Quarters in cities such as Zamość and Lviv. This influence is most evident in the sacred architecture of churches built by the Armenian community, where designs based on historic landmarks such as the cathedrals of Ani, Zvartnots and Etchmiadzin have been used as inspirational templates to construct these structures in their new surroundings. This tradition still continues into the present day as Armenian immigration has shifted away from the traditional areas of outmigration in Europe and the Middle East into the Americas and Australia.

Khachkars have also become additional signifiers of Armenian identity and have been erected in recent year in cities such as Wrocław, Kraków, Elbląg in Poland, Novi Sad in Serbia, Beirut in Lebanon as well as in Dearborn, Michigan. Many of these were also built as memorials by these local communities as memorials commemorating the Armenian genocide.

20th century secular buildings in Armenia

21st century buildings in Armenia

Gallery 
Examples of Armenian religious architecture

Armenia

Azerbaijan and Artsakh

Iran

Turkey

Middle East

North America

Russia

See also 
Armenian church architecture
Armenian art
Armenian Khachkars
Armenian Palaces
Research on Armenian Architecture
Children of Armenia Fund
Tumo Center for Creative Technologies

References

Bibliography

External links 
 Armenian Historical Monuments  presented by the Research on Armenian Architecture organization
 Arts of Armenia:Architecture, a chapter in a book by Dickran Kouymjian of Cal State University, Fresno
 Index of Armenian Art: Armenian Architecture, a listing and details of Armenian architecture grouped by classification
 Pictorial Gallery of Armenian Architecture
 Armenian Architecture Collection of the Rensselaer Digital Collections, part of Rensselaer Polytechnic Institute (includes monasteries in Western Armenia)
 Armenian Architecture in Turkey and the City of Ani
 Armenian Architectures and Its Protection in Turkey
 Cilician Armenian Architecture

Architecture in Armenia
Church architecture
Christian architecture